Fabio Luca Scherer (born 13 June 1999) is a racing driver from Switzerland, currently competing in the endurance racing, representing Inter Europol Competition in the FIA World Endurance Championship.

Scherer started his single-seater career in 2016, staying in Formula 4 series for two seasons. In 2018 he moved to 2018 FIA Formula 3 European Championship, racing for Motopark Academy. Scherer then competed for Charouz Racing System in the new FIA Formula 3 Championship for 2019.

Since 2021 he competes in the endurance racing, taking on the FIA World Endurance Championship including 24 Hours of Le Mans, European Le Mans Series and IMSA SportsCar Championship.

Sportscar career

2020: DTM debut 
For the 2020 season, Scherer would migrate to sportscar racing, driving an Audi RS5 Turbo DTM for the Audi Sport Team WRT in the Deutsche Tourenwagen Masters. He experienced a challenging campaign, only breaking through to score points at the Zolder Circuit, where he finished fifth on two occasions. The Swiss driver ended up 16th in the standings, last of all full-time competitors.

Racing Record

Career summary 

† As Scherer was a guest driver, he was ineligible for points.
* Season still in progress.

Complete ADAC Formula 4 Championship results 
(key) (Races in bold indicate pole position) (Races in italics indicate fastest lap)

Complete FIA Formula 3 European Championship results 
(key) (Races in bold indicate pole position) (Races in italics indicate fastest lap)

‡ Half points awarded as less than 75% of race distance was completed.

Complete FIA Formula 3 Championship results 
(key) (Races in bold indicate pole position; races in italics indicate points for the fastest lap of top ten finishers)

Complete Deutsche Tourenwagen Masters results 
(key) (Races in bold indicate pole position; races in italics indicate fastest lap)

† Did not finish, but was classified as he had completed more than 90% of the race distance.

Complete 24 Hours of Le Mans results

Complete FIA World Endurance Championship results 
(key) (Races in bold indicate pole position) (Races in italics indicate fastest lap)

† Non World Endurance Championship entries are ineligible to score points.
* Season still in progress.

Complete European Le Mans Series results
(Races in bold indicate pole position; results in italics indicate fastest lap)

Complete IMSA SportsCar Championship results
(key) (Races in bold indicate pole position; results in italics indicate fastest lap)

† Points only counted towards the Michelin Endurance Cup, and not the overall LMP2 Championship.
* Season still in progress.

Complete Porsche Supercup results 
(key) (Races in bold indicate pole position) (Races in italics indicate fastest lap)

† As Scherer was a guest driver, he was ineligible to score points.

References

External links 
 
 

Swiss racing drivers
1999 births
Living people
ADAC Formula 4 drivers
Italian F4 Championship drivers
FIA Formula 3 European Championship drivers
FIA Formula 3 Championship drivers
Deutsche Tourenwagen Masters drivers
24 Hours of Le Mans drivers
FIA World Endurance Championship drivers
European Le Mans Series drivers
Porsche Supercup drivers
WeatherTech SportsCar Championship drivers
Jenzer Motorsport drivers
US Racing drivers
Motopark Academy drivers
Charouz Racing System drivers
W Racing Team drivers
United Autosports drivers
Audi Sport drivers
UAE F4 Championship drivers
Sauber Motorsport drivers